The Okanagan Symphony Orchestra is a Canadian instrumental music ensemble based in Kelowna, British Columbia. As of 2018, its conductor is Rosemary Thomson. The orchestra performs both classical and contemporary orchestral works. The orchestra is based at the Vernon and District Performing Arts Centre.

History
The orchestra was founded in 1960 by its first conductor Willem Bertsch; in 1964 Douglas Talney became conductor, and then in 1965 Leonard Camplin took over and remained conductor for many years.

In 1970 the Okanagan Symphony Choir was established directed at first by Jocelyn Pritchard, who was succeeded in 1978 by Imant Raminsh.

In 1974 the orchestra received a Canada Council grant to hire a resident cellist. In 1991 the principle violinist was Imant Raminsh.

In 1981 OSO members organized Sinfonia, a chamber orchestra.  In 1988 a youth orchestra was organized by Raminsh.

A performance of the OSO was hear nation-wide on a CBC Radio broadcast in 1989.

The Okanagan Symphony Orchestra performed a series of concerts in 2017 with guest musician Sean Bray to celebrate Canada's 150th birthday.

For many years the principal horn player for the orchestra was Edmond House; he retired in 2017.

In April 2018 the orchestra performed in concert with singer/sosngwriter Sarah Slean. A 2018 concert, "Prodigy", featured 12-year-old pianist and composer Kevin Chen performing early works by Mozart.

In 2019, in the orchestra presented two Masterworks concerts titled "Themes and Innovations". In December of that year, in anticipation of its 60th anniversary, the symphony, along with the OSO CHorus, presented Handel's Messiah, the first in a series of planned special performances.

References

Symphony orchestras
Canadian orchestras
British Columbia music
Musical groups from Kelowna
Musical groups established in 1960
1960 establishments in British Columbia